Tomb Raider comic book series is based on the video game franchise Tomb Raider, currently produced by Crystal Dynamics (formerly by Core Design), which features the character of Lara Croft. The original series of comics, which were released between 1999 and 2005, were published by Top Cow and were primarily based on the games released by Core Design. In 2014, following the reboot of the Tomb Raider franchise, the series was revived and is currently being published by Dark Horse Comics. The new timeline of events is based upon the rebooted iteration of Lara Croft and her adventures.

Publication history
The series, which ran from 1999 to 2005 (in which the fiftieth and final issue was released), consisted of monthly issues published by Top Cow Productions, who secured the rights to producing comics after a long struggle. Preceding this series, French publisher Glenat got the green light from Eidos France to produce a comic series called Dark Eons based on the Tomb Raider games, which was taken off the market shortly after. Besides the monthly series, a parallel 12-part series called Journeys, which ran from 2001 to 2003, was also published.

The comics are primarily based on the same continuity as the games by Core Design, in which Lara's plane crashes when she is twenty-one years old (rather than the latter games by Crystal Dynamics, the plane crash happening when she was only nine years old), but the exact details are changed.  In the comic, Lara is accompanied by both her parents and her fiancé, on the plane trip taken to celebrate her impending marriage (in the game series, Lara's plane is chartered to take on a skiing holiday). Writers Dan Jurgens, John Nay Riber, and James Bonny worked on the series, which also featured the art of Andy Park, Michael Turner, Billy Tan, and Adam Hughes, amongst others.

There are one shots occasionally released and talk of the comic being reintroduced to tie into the Tomb Raider: Legend edited continuity. There have also been frequent crossovers with other Top Cow publications such as Fathom, The Darkness, Magdalena, and Witchblade. The debut issue of Tomb Raider was the number one-selling comic book of 1999.

In late 2006, Top Cow released the Tomb Raider Compendium. This was a large, single volume, collected edition of the Tomb Raider comic series; a hardcover version followed in 2008. The book encompasses all 50 issues (well over 1000 pages), as well as a cover gallery featuring select covers, most of them done by Adam Hughes. It is a full-size, full-color reproduction of all fifty issues on high-quality paper. This collection, however, does not include the various specials, minis, and one-shots from the series. This would probably explain why the compendium has "Volume One" written on the side.

Bandai Entertainment also published a "tankōbon" set of volumes, which reprints older stories in black-and-white in a smaller book.

Tomb Raider comics were announced to return in late 2007, but this was delayed due to licensing issues.

In 2014, Dark Horse Comics began publishing a new series of comics, set between the 2013 reboot and its sequel. Gail Simone wrote the first six issues, before collaborating with Rhianna Pratchett for the next arc. Pratchett took over for the rest of the series.

In 2016, another series started to bridge the gap between Rise of the Tomb Raider and the next game in the series, Shadow of the Tomb Raider.

Publications
Primary series
 Tomb Raider, Starring Lara Croft vol. 1 (1999-2005) changed to Lara Croft, Tomb Raider with issue #25 in 2002 due to the release of the movie of the same name in 2001 was the first ongoing series featuring the character published by Top Cow Productions. It ran for 50 issues with Tomb Raider #0 and #1/2.
 Tomb Raider vol. 2 (2014-2015) was the second ongoing series published by Dark Horse Comics. It ran for 18 issues and was written by Gail Simone and Rhianna Pratchett.
 Tomb Raider vol. 3 (2016-2017) was the third ongoing series published by Dark Horse Comics. It ran for 12 issues and was written by Mariko Tamaki.

Limited series
 Tomb Raider, Starring Lara Croft: Journeys (2001-2003) 12-issue limited series; written by Fiona Kai Avery; penciled by Drew Johnson, Gerardo Sandoval, Drew Green, Carlos Mota, Manny Clark, and Mun Kao Tan; inks by Jay Leisten and Marlo Alquiza; colors by J.D. Smith, Tyson Wengler, and Brian Buccelato
 Tomb Raider: Survivor's Crusade (2017) 4-issue limited series; written by Collin Kelly and Jackson Lanzing, penciled by Ashley A. Woods
 Tomb Raider: Inferno (2018) 4-issue limited series; written by Jackson Lanzing, penciled by PJ Holden
 
One-shots
 Tomb Raider/Witchblade (1997) by writer and penciler Michael Turner, inks by Joe Weems V, colors by J.D. Smith
 Witchblade/Tomb Raider (1998) by writer Michael Turner and Bill O'Neil, pencils by Michael Turner, inks by Joe Weems V, colors by J.D. Smith
 Witchblade/Tomb Raider #1/2 (2000) by writer Michael Turner and Bill O'Neil, pencils by Ken Cha, inks by Andy Owens, colors by Matt Nelson
 Tomb Raider: Origins (2000) by writer Dan Jurgens; pencils by Mark Pajarillo; inks by Danny Miki
 Tomb Raider/The Darkness Special (2001) by writer David Wohl, art by Billy Tan, colors by Steve Firchow
 Tomb Raider: The Greatest Treasure of All (2002) by writer Dan Jurgens; art by Joe Jusko
 Tomb Raider: Epiphany (2003) by writer Dan Jurgens; pencils by Darryl Banks; inks by Al Vey
 Tomb Raider: Scarface’s Treasure (2003) by writer Geoff Johns, art by Mark Texeira, colors by Beth Sotelo
 Tomb Raider: Takeover (2004) by writer James Bonny; pencils by Scott Benefiel; inks by Jasen Rodriguez
 Tomb Raider: Arabian Nights (2004) by writer Fiona Kai Avery; art by Billy Tan
 Tomb Raider: Cover Gallery (2006) featuring art of: Marc Silvestri, Adam Hughes, Michael Turner and more
 Tomb Raider: The Beginning (2013) by writer Rhianna Pratchett; pencils by Andrea Mutti and Nicolás Daniel Selma

Collected editions 
Tomb Raider Series Trades

Tomb Raider Compendium Edition

Tomb Raider Tankōbon

Tomb Raider Archives

Tomb Raider Library Edition

Tomb Raider Omnibus

References

External links
 Tomb Raider Comics.com 
 
 Tomb Raider at the Big Comic Book DataBase
 Tomb Raider: Scarface's Treasure (previews). Newsarama. February 20, 2002.
 Tomb Raider #50 (previews). Newsarama. February 15, 2005.

Interviews
 Heroine Chic: Adam Hughes Talks 'Wonder Woman', 'Tomb Raider'. Comic Book Resources. February 15, 2001.
 Tomb Raider: Arabian Nights. Newsarama. August 2, 2004.

Works based on Tomb Raider
Comics based on video games